Wilhelm II may refer to:
 William II of Isenburg-Wied (reigned 1383–88)
 William II, Duke of Bavaria (reigned 1404–17)
 William II, Landgrave of Hesse (reigned 1493–1509)
 William II, Elector of Hesse (reigned 1821–47)
 William II, German Emperor (reigned 1888–1918)
 William II of Württemberg (reigned 1891–1918)

See also

 Kaiser Wilhelm II (disambiguation)
 Willem II (disambiguation)
 William II (disambiguation)